The John Ashworth House is a historic residence in Beaver, Utah, United States, that is listed on the National Register of Historic Places (NRHP).

Description
The house is located at 110 South 100 West and was built in 1880. It was built for John Ashworth, who was born in England and who was the first manager-superintendent of the Beaver Woolen Mills, and who also served as Beaver's second mayor, during 1880–82. It is a hall and parlor plan house with a shed extension to the rear, built in 1880.

The structure was listed on the NRHP November, 29 1983.

See also

 National Register of Historic Places listings in Beaver County, Utah

Notes

References

External links

Houses on the National Register of Historic Places in Utah
National Register of Historic Places in Beaver County, Utah
Houses in Beaver County, Utah
Houses completed in 1880